José Luis Santamaría Buitrago (born 14 January 1973) is a Spanish retired footballer who played mainly as a central defender.

Club career
After unsuccessfully emerging through the ranks of Real Madrid, Madrid-born Santamaría joined Real Valladolid for the 1995–96 campaign, appearing in 41 La Liga matches in his second season and subsequently being an essential defensive member. During three years he often partnered another Real Madrid youth product in the back-four, José García Calvo.

From 2000 to 2004, however, a bad run with injuries and subsequent loss of form limited Santamaría to just 18 games combined (none in his last year), and he retired in June 2004 after 185 competitive appearances with the Castile and León club. His only goal as a professional and in the top flight occurred on 1 March 1998, as he scored the opener in a 2–1 home win against CD Tenerife.

Personal life
Santamaría was nicknamed "Funny One" during his playing career, due to his love for books.

References

External links

1973 births
Living people
Footballers from Madrid
Spanish footballers
Association football defenders
La Liga players
Segunda División players
Real Madrid Castilla footballers
Real Valladolid players